82 is the second studio album by the Kenyan house/funk trio Just a Band, released in 2009 following their debut release Scratch to Reveal. Just A Band signed a US licensing deal with Akwaaba Music, who re-released 82 on February 23, 2010.

Album information

Just a Band released the music video for the first single from the album, "Usinibore" on July 4, 2009. The video - created by the band themselves - helped land the single in the We Are Hunted charts, peaking at number three on November 11, 2009.

82 was released on October 2, 2009, at a pre-launch release party. Compared with the trio's previous release, Scratch to Reveal, 82 is 12 minutes, 9 seconds longer and contains 13 tracks and 1 hidden track. The playlist features fewer guest artists (Bien Baraza, Juliani and Wambura Mitaru), and the trio have undertaken greater singing roles themselves.

Ha-He
The band released the video for their second single from the album "Ha-He" on Wednesday 17 March 2010. The video is a spoof of blaxploitation films, featuring a protagonist named "Makmende". The video subsequently became popular, and has been described as "Kenya’s first viral internet meme". The band were featured on CNN, The Wall Street Journal and Fast Company as a result.

Reception
Reviews for the album were strongly positive; Exclaim! described it as resplendent in its cool tones and chilled vocals and very distinctive, regardless of its origin, and The Huffington Post described the album as the sign of a generational shift.

Track listing

Personnel

Just a Band

Production

External links 
just-a-band.com (Official website)

References

2009 albums
Just a Band albums